Count Albin Csáky de Körösszeg et Adorján (19 April 1841 – 15 December 1912) was a Hungarian politician, who served as Minister of Religion and Education between 1888 and 1894. He finished his secondary school studies in Lőcse, then he learnt in Kassa. He became representative of the Diet of Hungary in 1862. 1900–1906 and 1910–1912 he served as Speaker of the House of Magnates.

As minister for religion and education in 1890, Csáky introduced an ordinance to enforce the existing mixed-marriage laws, which stipulated that children of mixed marriages should be baptised in the faith corresponding to the parent of the same sex. The Catholic Church had been regularly defying these laws, and Csáky hoped to bring an end to this, but his actions provoked a strong hostile reaction from the Church.

Family
Albin Csáky's parents were Ágost Csáky (1803–1883) and Iphigenia Prónay. His wife was Countess Anna Bolza, daughter of István Bolza and Lujza Vay. They married in Szarvas. They had six children:
 István Csáky (1867–1892): studied law, he served as representative in Szarvas. He committed suicide because he believed that the illness from which he was suffering was incurable.
 Mária Albina Csáky (1868–1912): wife of Andor Harkányi from 1910.
 László Csáky (1869–1909): ispan of Szepes County and Ugocsa County, his wife was Countess Augusta von Degenfeld-Schönburg.
 Eleonóra Csáky (1870–1945): wife of László Hertelendy from 1893.
 Károly Csáky (1873–1945): served as Minister of Defence of Hungary, married three times: Valéria Földváry, Erzsébet Ordódy, Anna Schiro.
 Ilona Csáky (1878–1934): wife of Baron Otto Friedrich Benz von Albkron from 1904.
 Imre Csáky (1882–1961): served as Minister of Foreign Affairs of Hungary, his wife was Countess Mária Annunziáta Sztáray. He died in the Canary Islands.

References

 Magyar Életrajzi Lexikon

1841 births
1912 deaths
People from Krompachy
Education ministers of Hungary
Speakers of the House of Magnates
Members of the Hungarian Academy of Sciences
Albin, Csaky
Hungarian politicians who committed suicide
Suicides in Hungary
Knights of the Golden Fleece of Austria
1912 suicides
Lord-lieutenants of a county in Hungarian Kingdom